Thomas Corcoran (born 1909) was an English professional footballer who played as a right back.

Career
Born in Earlestown, Corcoran played for Atherton, Bradford City and Rochdale. For Bradford City he made 3 appearances in the Football League.

Sources

References

1909 births
Year of death missing
English footballers
Bradford City A.F.C. players
Rochdale A.F.C. players
English Football League players
Association football fullbacks